Craig County is a county in the U.S. state of Oklahoma. As of the 2010 census, the population was 15,029. Its county seat is Vinita. The county was organized in 1907, shortly before statehood, and named for Granville Craig, a prominent Cherokee farmer who lived in the Bluejacket area.

History
In the early 1800s, this area was part of the hunting grounds of the Osage nation and other Plains tribes, some of whom had migrated west from other areas. Members of the Cherokee Nation began moving into the area during the 1830s, particularly after Indian Removal by the US government, which forced them on the "Trail of Tears" to west of the Mississippi River, when they were given land by the United States in exchange for their territory in the Southeast. The area was sparsely populated until after the Civil War. The Texas Road and the East Shawnee Cattle Trail, used for cattle drives from Texas, ran through the eastern part of the present-day Craig County.

Between 1867 and 1870, the U. S. government moved the Shawnee and Delaware tribes into this area from Kansas, another section of Indian Territory. Then the area was assigned as part of the Delaware and Cooweescoowee districts of the Cherokee Nation, Indian Territory, after the US government had made new treaties with the tribes that had allied with the Confederacy during the Civil War.

In 1871, the federal government took Cherokee land for the Missouri, Kansas and Texas Railroad to construct a north–south railroad through this area, while the Atlantic and Pacific Railroad (later acquired by the St. Louis and San Francisco Railway) was allowed to build an east–west line that ran through Vinita in the same year. This line was extended through Tulsa, Oklahoma in 1881–2.

Coal mining began in this area after the Civil War. Mine companies used both tunnel and strip mines, but they did not begin major production until about 1900. Production has continued into the 21st century.

Other resource exploitation was based on oil, and the first oil refinery began operations by 1911; it was operated by Sinclair Oil until the 1920s. Otherwise, farming and ranching were the mainstays of the county economy.

The county was organized in 1907, at the Oklahoma Statehood Convention. It was named for Granville Craig, a prominent Cherokee farmer of mixed race who had property near Bluejacket.

Geography
The county lies in the Osage Plains, on the western edge of the Ozark Plateau, and drains into several tributaries of the Neosho River.

Major highways

Adjacent counties
 Labette County, Kansas (north)
 Cherokee County, Kansas (northeast)
 Ottawa County (east)
 Delaware County (southeast)
 Mayes County (south)
 Rogers County (southwest)
 Nowata County (west)

Demographics

As of the census of 2006, there were 14,880 people, 5,620 households, and 3,945 families residing in the county.  The population density was 20 people per square mile (8/km2).  There were 6,459 housing units at an average density of 8 per square mile (3/km2).  The racial makeup of the county was 68.54% White, 16.31% Native American, 3.09% Black or African American, 0.18% Asian, 0.03% Pacific Islander, 0.48% from other races, and 11.37% from two or more races.  1.20% of the population were Hispanic or Latino of any race.

There were 5,620 households, out of which 30.90% had children under the age of 18 living with them, 57.30% were married couples living together, 9.70% had a female householder with no husband present, and 29.80% were non-families. 27.00% of all households were made up of individuals, and 13.90% had someone living alone who was 65 years of age or older.  The average household size was 2.46 and the average family size was 2.97.

In the county, the population was spread out, with 23.90% under the age of 18, 7.80% from 18 to 24, 27.90% from 25 to 44, 24.30% from 45 to 64, and 16.20% who were 65 years of age or older.  The median age was 39 years. For every 100 females there were 101.10 males.  For every 100 females age 18 and over, there were 98.60 males.

The median income for a household in the county was $30,997, and the median income for a family was $36,499. Males had a median income of $26,704 versus $20,082 for females. The per capita income for the county was $16,539.  About 10.90% of families and 13.70% of the population were below the poverty line, including 17.30% of those under age 18 and 11.90% of those age 65 or over.

Politics

Communities

Cities
 Vinita (county seat)

Towns
 Big Cabin
 Bluejacket
 Ketchum
 Welch

Unincorporated communities
 Centralia
 White Oak (a census-designated place)

NRHP sites

The following sites in Craig County are listed on the National Register of Historic Places:
 Craig County Courthouse, Vinita
 First Methodist Episcopal Church, South, Vinita
 Hotel Vinita, Vinita
 McDougal Filling Station, Vinita
 Randall Tire Company, Vinita
 Spraker Service Station, Vinita

References

Further reading
 "Craig County," Vertical File, Research Division, Oklahoma Historical Society, Oklahoma City.
 The Heritage of Craig County and Cooweescoowee and Delaware Districts, Indian Territory, Vol. 3 (Vinita, Okla.: Craig County Genealogical Society, 2000).
 The Story of Craig County: Its People and Places, 2 vols. (Vinita, Okla.: Craig County Heritage Association, 1984–1991).

External links
 Encyclopedia of Oklahoma History and Culture - Craig County
 Oklahoma Digital Maps: Digital Collections of Oklahoma and Indian Territory

 
1907 establishments in Oklahoma
Populated places established in 1907